Teobert Maler, later Teoberto (12 January 1842 – 22 November 1917) was an explorer who devoted his energies to documenting the ruins of the Maya civilization.

Biography
Teobert Maler was born in Rome to German parents. His father was a diplomat for the Duchy of Baden. Maler studied architecture and engineering in Karlsruhe, then at the age of 21 moved to Vienna where he took a job with architect Heinrich von Ferstel, and became an Austrian citizen.

He was eager to see more of the world and went to Mexico as a soldier with Emperor Maximilian. He rose from Cadet to Captain.  After surrendering to the Mexican Republican forces, Maler opted to stay in Mexico rather than being exiled back to Europe. Maler later obtained Mexican citizenship and changed his first name to "Teoberto", more easily pronounced in the Spanish language. 

Maler developed interests in photography and in the antiquities of Mesoamerica. In 1876 he made detailed photos of the structures at Mitla.  In the summer of the following year he moved to San Cristóbal de las Casas, and in July set out to visit the ruins of Palenque. While several accounts of the site had been published by this time, it was still little visited, and Maler needed to employ a team of the local Indios to open a path to the ruin with machetes. He spent a week at Palenque, sketching, measuring, and photographing the site, and became aware that earlier published accounts were inadequate, and that most earlier visitors had limited their descriptions to only a portion of the buildings observed there. While Maler was there another visitor came to the ruins, Gustave Bernoulli, a Swiss botanist who shared his interest in Maya sites, and had recently made a visit to Tikal. Bernoulli confirmed Maler's suspicion that there was much work that needed to be done to document the area's ruins.

In the spring of 1878, Maler was obliged to return to Europe to settle his father's estate, which was tied up in considerable legal difficulties. While the lawyers he hired sorted it out, Maler lived in Paris, where he gave lectures on Mexican antiquities and studied and read everything about Mesoamerica he could find in the city. In 1884 the estate was settled, with Maler inheriting a small fortune, and he returned to Mexico to devote himself to study of the Maya.

He settled in Yucatán with small house in the town of Ticul, where he set up a photographic studio and learned the Maya language.  However he spent most of his time in the forests, accompanied by a few Maya to help clear the jungle from the ruins and carry Maler's photographic equipment.  He started off visiting major sites already well-known, such as Chichen Itza and Uxmal, but zealously followed all leads and became the first to document many new ruins. At Chichen, he lived in the ruins for 3 months, and documented the site much more fully than had earlier visitors.

Over the next years, Maler also made investigations of many remote sites in the el Petén region of Guatemala and along the course of the Usumacinta River.

Maler became disgusted by the then common practice of 19th century antiquarians and archeologists of removing interesting sculptures from the sites to send to cities in Europe or North America. Maler noted the damage to the sites this often caused. He became dedicated to the notion that the ruins should be preserved intact, and wrote extensively to the Mexican government advocating that approach. Maler's views are now considered ahead of their time.

Maler realized the importance of publishing his investigations, but had somewhat mixed success. The Peabody Institute of Harvard University arranged to publish his reports starting in 1898.  A series of important books resulted, but the relationship between Maler and the Peabody was strained. Maler tried to insist that the books contain more minute detail and illustrations than the Peabody editors wished to include, and communications were difficult as Maler often left to make new expeditions in the forests and could not be contacted for months at a time for proofreading. The Peabody ended their agreement with Maler in 1909, although it took them until 1912 to finish the publication of the material they had received from him.  The books are still an important reference in Maya studies.

Maler ended his physically demanding expeditions in the jungles in 1905 and retired to his home in Mérida, Yucatán.

In 1910 Maler made a trip to Europe in hopes of finding patrons for publishing more of his reports, but had no success other than to sell some of his photographs to the Bibliothèque nationale in Paris.

In his later years Teoberto Maler was known as something of a misanthrope. His money apparently gone due to some poor money investments and the economical crisis of 1907 in Yucatán, he made a modest living selling copies of his photographs to tourists and young archaeologists and giving lectures on Maya art and architecture at the Mérida school of fine arts. Maler died in Mérida, aged 75.

Many of his accounts were published posthumously, one batch in the 1930s, more in the 1970s and 1990s.

Notes

References

External links 

 Teobert Maler on Mesoweb.com multi-page site with Maler photos and excerpts from his writings, and a biography
 Teoberto Maler photos on Throckmorton Fine Art Link is broken

19th-century explorers
20th-century explorers
Explorers of Central America
19th-century Mesoamericanists
20th-century Mesoamericanists
German Mesoamericanists
Mexican Mesoamericanists
Mesoamerican epigraphers
Mesoamerican archaeologists
Mayanists
Archaeologists from Vienna
German explorers
Austrian explorers
German expatriates in Italy
Writers from Karlsruhe
1842 births
1917 deaths
German emigrants to the Austrian Empire
Austrian Empire emigrants to Mexico